This list records notable individuals who have participated in the industry.

Wireless experimenters
 Edward Gustavus Campbell Barton
 Frank Prosser Bowden
 William Henry Bragg
 William Rooke Creswell
 Henry Walter Jenvey
 John P. King
 Edward Hope Kirkby
 Oswald Francis (Os) Mingay
 John Yeates Nelson
 Joseph Patrick Slattery
 Frederick Soddy
 George Phillip Stevens
 Henry Sutton
 George Augustine Taylor
 Richard Threlfall
 Charles Todd
 Philip Billingsley Walker

Broadcasting pioneers
 A. E. Bennett, pioneer commercial radio manager
 Sir Hugh Denison, radio pioneer and manager
 Sir Ernest Fisk, radio pioneer and founder of Amalgamated Wireless (Australasia)
 Sir Bernard Heinze, musician and pioneer advisor to the ABC
 William G. James, musician and pioneer ABC broadcaster and manager
 Oliver J. Nilsen, radio pioneer
 Mel Morris, pioneer football commentator
 Sir Charles Moses, pioneer sports broadcaster, and later ABC Manager
 Jack O'Hagan, composer and pioneer ABC and commercial broadcaster
 Frank Thring Sr, pioneer film director and radio manager
 Emil Voigt, pioneer of commercial radio

Management
 Alan Bond, proprietor of television and radio interests
 Sir Richard Boyer, administrator of ABC 
 Sir Talbot Duckmanton, ABC manager
 Ted Harris, director and manager
 David Hill, ABC Chair
 Donald McDonald, ABC manager
 Sir Frank Packer, proprietor of television and radio interests
 Kerry Packer, proprietor of television and radio interests
 Sir Eric Pearce, commercial broadcaster and station manager
 Mark Scott, ABC manager
 John Singleton, proprietor of radio interests
 Ron Sparks, commercial radio manager
 James Spigelman, ABC Chair

Producers, back-room personnel, etc.
 Dorothy Crawford, drama producer 
 Hector Crawford, drama producer
 George Edwards, radio actor and producer
 Grace Gibson, drama producer
 Gwen Meredith, writer of radio plays
 Rex Rienits. writer of radio plays
 John Saul, radio actor and director
 Edward (E. V.) Timms, writer of radio plays

Announcers, DJs, etc.
 Phillip Adams, ABC and commercial broadcaster
 Waleed Aly, ABC broadcaster
 Ward "Pally" Austin, commercial broadcaster
 Jim Ball, commercial broadcaster
 Norman Banks, commercial broadcaster
 Ray Barrett, commercial radio broadcaster, and later television and stage actor
 John Blackman, commercial broadcaster
 Stuart Bocking, commercial broadcaster
 Bruno Bouchet, commercial broadcaster
 Philip Brady, commercial broadcaster
 John Burns, commercial broadcaster
 Leon Byner, commercial broadcaster
 Brian Carlton, commercial broadcaster
 Mike Carlton, ABC & commercial broadcaster
 Ron Casey – Sydney, commercial broadcaster
 Gordon Chater, commercial broadcaster and radio actor
 Don Chipp, politician and commercial broadcaster
 Jack Davey, commercial broadcaster
 Vic Davies, commercial broadcaster
 Smoky Dawson, singer and commercial radio presenter
 John Dease, commercial broadcaster
 James Dibble, ABC broadcaster
 George Donikian, commercial broadcaster
 Geraldine Doogue, ABC broadcaster
 Bob Dyer, commercial broadscaster
 Dolly Dyer, commercial broadcaster
 Gregg Easton, commercial broadcaster
 Malcolm T. Elliott, commercial broadcaster
 Dick Fair, commercial broadcaster
 Noel Ferrier, comedian and commercial broadcaster
 Greg Fleet, commercial broadcaster
 Graeme Gilbert, commercial broadcaster
 Grant Goldman, commercial broadcaster
 Andy Grace, commercial broadcaster
 Ugly Dave Gray, comedian and commercial broadcaster
 Ray Hadley, commercial broadcaster
 Happy Hammond, commercial broadcaster
 Peter Hand, commercial broadcaster
 Tommy Hanlon Jr., commercial broadcaster
 Mary Hardy, comedian and commercial broadcaster
 Wendy Harmer, ABC & commercial broadcaster
 Derryn Hinch, commercial broadcaster
 Peter Hitchener, commercial broadcaster
 Dave Hughes, commercial broadcaster
 Darren James, commercial broadcaster
 Alan Jones, commercial broadcaster
 Barry Jones, commercial broadcaster
 Brendan Jones, commercial broadcaster
 Amanda Keller, commercial broadcaster
 Fran Kelly, ABC broadcaster
 Graham Kennedy, ABC and commercial broadcaster
 Jeff Kennett, politician and commercial broadcaster
 Sonia Kruger, commercial broadcaster
 Alwyn Kurts, commercial broadcaster
 Don Lane, television compere and commercial broadcaster
 Kate Langbroek, commercial broadscaster
 John Laws, commercial broadcaster
 Tony Leonard, commercial broadcaster
 Jack Lumsdaine, singer, songwriter and commercial broadcaster
 Keith McGowan, commercial broadcaster
 Todd McKenney, commercial broadcaster
 Bruce Mansfield, commercial broadcaster
 Richard Mercer, commercial broadcaster
 Neil Mitchell, commercial broadcaster
 Tony Moclair, commercial broadcaster
 Jason Morrison, commercial broadcaster
 Doug Mulray, commercial broadcaster
 Jackie O (Jackie Henderson), commercial broadcaster
 Gwen Plumb, commercial broadcaster and radio actor
 Steve Price, commercial broadcaster
 Roy Rene "Mo", comedian and commercial broadcaster
 Kel Richards, commercial broadcaster
 Glenn Ridge, commercial broadcaster
 Andrew Rochford, commercial broadcaster
 Stan Rofe, commercial broadcaster
 Bob Rogers, commercial broadcaster
 Kyle Sandilands, commercial broadcaster
 Ernie Sigley, commercial broadcaster
 Trevor Sinclair, commercial broadcaster
 Justin Smith, commercial broadcaster
 Keith Smith, ABC and commercial broadcaster
 Peter Smith, ABC and commercial broadcaster
 Ron E Sparks, commercial broadcaster
 John Stanley, commercial broadcaster
 Ross Stevenson, commercial broadcaster
 Chrissie Swan, commercial broadcaster
 Wilfrid Thomas, ABC broadcaster
 Ian Turpie commercial broadcaster, but mainly known for his TV work
 Subby Valentine, commercial broadcaster
 Denis Walter, commercial broadcaster
 Tim Webster, commercial broadcaster
 Stan Zemanek, commercial broadcaster

Specialist broadcasters
 Eric Baume, journalist, commentator and commercial broadcaster
 Dick Bentley, ABC comedian
 John Bluthal, radio actor
 John Cargher, ABC and commercial presenter of classical music programs
 John Cazabon, radio actor
 Guy Doleman, radio actor
 John Ewart, radio actor and "Jimmy" of ABC Children's Session
 Jane Fennell, ABC children's presenter
 Willie Fennell, commercial radio comedian and actor
 Peter Finch, radio actor who later became a prominent Hollywood star
 Atholl Fleming, "Mac" of ABC Children's Session
 Andrew Ford, music journalist and presenter
 Stewart Ginn, radio actor
 Neva Carr Glyn, radio actor
 Reg Goldsworthy, radio actor
 Reg Grundy, radio actor and sportcaster who later became a television mogul
 Earle Hackett, ABC medical presenter
 Ron Haddrick, radio actor
 Patricia Kennedy, radio actor
 Bill Kerr, radio actor
 Dawn Lake, radio variety artist
 Bobby Limb, radio variety artist
 Doug McKenzie, commercial radio comedian
 Fr Bob Maguire, commercial religious broadcaster
 John Meillon, radio actor
 Crosbie Morrison, naturalist and broadcaster
 Ida Elizabeth Osbourne, ABC children's Session, later women's programs
 Jack Perry, commercial radio comedian
 Redmond Phillips, radio actor and writer
 Walter Pym, radio actor
 James Raglan, radio actor
 Ron Randell, radio actor who later became a prominent Hollywood star
 Deaconess Margaret Rodgers, religious broadcaster
 June Salter, radio actor
 Dinah Shearing, radio actor
 Muriel Steinbeck, radio actor
 Dr Norman Swan, ABC broadcaster
 Charles (Bud) Tingwell, radio actor
 Lou Vernon, radio actor
 George Wallace, commercial comedian
 Myf Warhurst, ABC popular music journalist and presenter
 John West, "The Showman", ABC theatre reviewer
 Robyn Williams, ABC science presenter

Sportscasters
 Mickey Arthur, cricket commentator
 Luke Ball, football commentator
 Harry Beitzel, football commentator
 Andrew Bews, football commentator
 Greg Blewett, cricket commentator
 Henry Blofeld, cricket commentator
 Graeme Bond, football commentator
 Allan Border, cricket commentator
 Dermott Brereton, footballer and commercial broadcaster
 Jonathan Brown, football commentator
 Nathan Brown, football commentator
 Bert Bryant, racecaller
 Wayne Carey, football commentator
 Ron Casey – Melbourne, commercial broadcaster and football commentator
 Ian Chappell, football commentator
 Tony Charlton, football commentator and commercial broadcaster
 Stuart Clark, cricket commentator
 Michael Christian, sportscaster
 Bill Collins racecaller and commercial broadcaster
 Dennis Cometti, football commentator
 Rohan Connolly, football commentator
 Scott Cummings, football commentator
 Jack Dyer, football commentator
 John Emburey, cricket commentator
 Denis Fitzgerald, football commentator
 Damien Fleming, cricket commentator
 John (Gibbsy) Gibbs, commercial broadcaster
 Gerard Healy, commercial sportscaster
 Des Hoysted, racecaller
 Rex Hunt, football commentator and commercial broadcaster, especially fishing programs
 Craig Hutchison, football commentator
 Chris Johnson, football commentator
 Dean Jones, cricket commentator
 David King, football commentator
 Tim Lane, football commentator
 Dr Peter Larkins, football commentator
 Darren Lehmann, cricket commentator
 Cameron Ling, football commentator
 Matthew Lloyd, football commentator
 Garry Lyon, football commentator
 Glenn McGrath, cricket commentator
 Ian Major, commercial broadcaster and football commentator
 Mick Malthouse, football commentator
 Greg Matthews, cricket commentator
 Leigh Matthews, football commentator
 Jack Mueller, football commentator
 Sam Newman, football commentator
 Angela Pippos, sportscaster
 Stephen Quartermain, football commentator
 Lou Richards, football commentator and commercial broadcaster
 Matthew Richardson, football commentator
 Dwayne Russell, commercial sportscaster
 Robert Shaw, footballer and broadcaster
 Tony Shaw, football commentator
 Mike Sheahan, football commentator
 Peter Sterling, football commentator
 John Tapp, racecaller
 Brian Taylor, football commentator and commercial broadcaster
 Mark Thompson, football commentator
 Michael Vaughan, cricket commentator
 Robert Walls, football commentator
 Tim Webster, commercial sportscaster
 Eric Welch, ABC and commercial broadcaster and sportscaster
 Mike Williamson, commercial broadcaster and sportscaster
 Caroline Wilson, football commentator

Newspaper owners / managers
 John Fairfax, purchased the Sydney Herald in 1841, which became The Sydney Morning Herald
 Greg Hywood, current (2018) CEO of Fairfax Media
 William McGarvie, one of the three founders of The Sydney Morning Herald

Journalists
 Waleed Aly
 Julia Baird
 Lucian Boz
 Mike Carlton
 Anne Davies
 Elizabeth Farrelly
 Peter FitzSimons
 Ross Gittins
 Richard Glover
 Peter Hartcher
 Amanda Hooton
 Adele Horin
 H. G. Kippax
 Roy Masters
 Anne Summers
 Kate McClymont

Communications and media